John Benson (1 October 1901 – 28 August 1971) was an Australian rules footballer who played with Collingwood in the Victorian Football League (VFL).

Family
The son of William Benson (1865-1943), and Annie Benson (1866-1943), née Hanley, John Benson was born at Warrnambool, Victoria on 1 October 1901.

He married Athalie Florence Pizzey (1906-1995) on 26 August 1933.

Education
He was educated at St James' Grammar School, which, at its 1920 move from St James' Anglican Church, in Upper Heidelberg Road, Ivanhoe, to its current location at The Ridgeway, also in Ivanhoe, was renamed Ivanhoe Grammar School.

He was not only the inaugural President of the Old Ivanhoe Grammarians' Association (OIGA) in 1920, but was also the longest-serving member of staff in the school's history. He retired in 1966, having served as a teacher for 47 years (1920-1966). The school's gymnasium is named after him.

He studied at the University of Melbourne, graduating with a Diploma in Commerce in April 1930.

Football
In 1928 he was awarded a half-blue in football by the Melbourne University Sports Union.

Death
He died at Sydney, New South Wales on 28 August 1971.

Notes

References

External links 

 
 
 Jack Benson's profile at Collingwood Forever

1901 births
1971 deaths
Australian rules footballers from Victoria (Australia)
Collingwood Football Club players
People educated at Ivanhoe Grammar School